Barkowo may refer to the following places in Poland:
Barkowo, Lower Silesian Voivodeship (south-west Poland)
Barkowo, Pomeranian Voivodeship (north Poland)
Barkowo, Warmian-Masurian Voivodeship (north Poland)
Barkowo, West Pomeranian Voivodeship (north-west Poland)